Sir Thomas Howard (1651–1701) was the only surviving son of Sir Robert Howard of Ashtead, Surrey.

He served as a Teller of the Exchequer from 1689 until his death, a post that provided him with a house at Westminster.  He was Member of Parliament for Castle Rising from 1685 to 1689 and from 1698 until his death, his father having the seat before him and in the intervening period.  He sat for Bletchingley in the two periods between sitting for Castle Rising.

He married Lady Diana, daughter of Francis Newport, 1st Earl of Bradford in 1683, by whom he had three sons  and a daughter.  Only one son survived him, dying the year after him aged 14.  His daughter Diana married (in 1703) Edward Ward, 8th Baron Dudley and 3rd Baron Ward, who died in 1704, leaving her pregnant with a posthumous son, who succeeded his father in the Dudley estates, but died in 1731 without issue.

His grave in Ashtead church is by William Stanton.

References
David W Hayton, Eveline Cruickshanks, and Stuart Handley, The House of Commons, 1690-1715 (Cambridge University Press for History of Parliament Trust 2002), 408–9.  

1651 births
1701 deaths
People from Ashtead
Thomas
English MPs 1685–1687
English MPs 1689–1690
English MPs 1690–1695
English MPs 1695–1698
English MPs 1698–1700
English MPs 1701